The NWA Illinois Heavyweight Championship is a championship defended in the NWA CCW professional wrestling promotion.

Title history

Footnotes

References

Wrestling-Titles.com

National Wrestling Alliance championships
National Wrestling Alliance state wrestling championships